In the music of Ireland, Irish rebel songs refer to folk songs which are primarily about the various rebellions against English (and later British) Crown rule. Songs about prior rebellions are a popular topic of choice among musicians which supported Irish nationalism and republicanism. In the 20th and 21st centuries, Irish rebel songs focus on physical force Irish republicanism in the context of the Troubles in Northern Ireland.

History
The tradition of rebel music in Ireland date back to the period of English (and later British) Crown rule, and describe historical events in Irish history such as rebellions against the Crown and reinforcing solidarity amongst the people of Ireland.

As well as a deep-rooted sense of tradition, rebel songs have nonetheless remained contemporary, and since 1922, the focus has moved onto the nationalist cause in Northern Ireland, including support for the IRA and Sinn Féin. However, the subject matter is not confined to Irish history, and includes the exploits of the Irish Brigades, who fought for the Republican side in the Spanish Civil War, and also those who participated in the American Civil War. There are also some songs that express sorrow over war (from a Republican perspective), such as Only our rivers run free, and some have been covered by bands that have tweaked lyrics to be explicitly anti-war, such as the cover of The Patriot Game by Scottish band The Bluebells.

Over the years, a number of bands have performed "crossover" music, that is, Irish rebel lyrics and instrumentation mixed with other, more pop styles. Damien Dempsey is known for his pop-influenced rebel ballads and bands like Seanchai and the Unity Squad and Beltaine's Fire combine Rebel music with Political hip hop and other genres.

Contemporary music 
Irish rebel music has occasionally gained international attention. The Wolfe Tones' version of A Nation Once Again was voted the number one song in the world by BBC World Service listeners in 2002. The Bog Savages of San Francisco are fronted by an escapee from Belfast's Long Kesh prison who made his break in the September 1983 "Great Escape" by the IRA.

Music of this genre has often courted controversy with some of this music effectively banned from the airwaves in the Republic of Ireland in the 1980s. More recently, Derek Warfield's music was banned from Aer Lingus flights, after the Ulster Unionist politician Roy Beggs Jr compared his songs to the speeches of Osama bin Laden. However, a central tenet of the justification for rebel music from its supporters is that it represents a long-standing tradition of freedom from tyranny.

Themes include "Arbour Hill", about the place; "Fergal O'Hanlon", about the man; "Northern Gaels"/"Crumlin Jail", about the prison; "The Ballad of Mairead Farrell", about the woman; "Seán Treacy", about the man; and "Pearse Jordan", about the man.

List of notable songs
Alternative Ulster, 1978
Amhrán na bhFiann, (a.k.a. The Soldier's Song) – The National Anthem 1910
Belfast Brigade 
Back Home in Derry, by Bobby Sands; to the tune of The Wreck of the Edmund Fitzgerald
The Bold Fenian Men a.k.a. Down by the Glenside
The Broad Black Brimmer
Come All You Warriors
Come Out Ye Black And Tans
Connaught Rangers (a.k.a. The Drums Were Beating), about the regiment
Erin Go Bragh
Follow me up to Carlow
Four Green Fields by Tommy Makem
Give Ireland Back To The Irish
God Save Ireland
Go on home, British soldiers
The Helicopter Song
Irish Citizen Army; about the organisation
Irish Volunteers; about the organisation
Johnston's Motor Car
Join the British Army
My Little Armalite
The Men Behind the Wire
The Minstrel Boy
Oró Sé do Bheatha 'Bhaile
The Peeler and the Goat
Roll of Honour
Soldiers of '22
 Sunday Bloody Sunday (by John Lennon and Yoko Ono — the U2 song of the same name is "not a rebel song")
Tiocfaidh ár lá (a.k.a. SAM song))
You'll Never Beat the Irish
Ambush At Drumnakilly
A Nation Once Again
Arthur McBride
Banna Strand (a.k.a. Lonely Banna Strand)
Boolavogue
The Boy from Tamlaghtduff
The Boys of the Old Brigade
The Boys of Wexford
The Croppy Boy
Dunlavin Green
Dying Rebel
Éamonn an Chnoic (a.k.a. Ned of the Hill)
The Fields of Athenry
The Foggy Dew (Irish ballad)
Four Green Fields
Gerard Casey; about the man.
Ireland Unfree; named for the oration
James Connolly; about the man
Joe McDonnell; about the man
Kevin Barry
Martin Hurson; about the man
Men of the West;
Only Our Rivers Run Free; by Mickey MacConnell
Pat of Mullingar
The Patriot Game
The People's Own MP
The Rising of the Moon
Sean South
Skibbereen
Streets of Sorrow/Birmingham Six
Take It Down from the Mast
Tom Williams; about the man. 
Tone's Grave (a.k.a. Bodenstown Churchyard)
There Were Roses, by Tommy Sands
The Valley of Knockanure
The Wearing of the Green
The Wind that Shakes the Barley
Women of Ireland (a.k.a. Mná na h-Éireann)

Sunday Bloody Sunday (U2 song)

The 1983 U2 album War includes the song "Sunday Bloody Sunday", a lament for the Northern Ireland troubles whose title alludes to the 1972 Bloody Sunday shooting of Catholic demonstrators by British soldiers. In concert, Bono began introducing the song with the disclaimer "this song is not a rebel song". These words are included in the version on Under a Blood Red Sky, the 1983 live album of the War Tour. The 1988 concert film Rattle and Hum includes a performance hours after the 1987 Remembrance Day bombing in Enniskillen, which Bono condemns in a mid-song rant.
 
In response, Sinéad O'Connor released a song with the title "This is a Rebel Song", as she explains in her live album How About I Be Me (And You Be You)?

Satire
During the 1990s, Irish comedian Dermot Morgan lampooned both the Wolfe Tones and the clichés of Irish rebel songs by singing about the martyrdom of Fido, an Alsatian dog who saves his IRA master in the Irish War of Independence. During a search of the house by the Black and Tans, Fido hides his master's hand grenade by eating it.  When Fido farts and the grenade explodes, the British comment: "Excuse me, mate, was there something your dog ate?!" In a parody of Thomas Osborne Davis' famous rebel song "A Nation Once Again", the song climaxes with the words: "Another martyr for old Ireland, by Britannia cruelly slain! I hope that somewhere up there I hope he'll be an Alsatian once again! An Alsatian once again! An Alsatian once again! That Fido who's now in ribbons will be an Alsatian once again!"

See also

Charlie and the Bhoys
The Clancy Brothers and Tommy Makem
The Dubliners
Go Lucky Four
David Kincaid
Christy Moore
Dermot O'Brien
Tuan

References 

Rebel song
Irish styles of music
Political music genres
Songs about revolutions